Britons in Mexico or British Mexicans, are Mexicans of British descent or British-born persons who have become naturalized citizens of Mexico.

The British have had a presence in Mexico since the Colonial era. However, the greatest exchange occurred following independence, notably with the Cornish miners in Hidalgo.

History

During the Colonial era, the Spanish restricted the entrance of other Europeans, however, some non-Spanish Europeans were present. In 1556, the English adventurer Robert Thomson encountered the Scotsman Tomás Blaque (Thomas Blake), who had been living in Mexico City for more than twenty years. Blaque is the first known Briton to have settled in what would become Mexico.

During his third voyage, the ship commanded by John Hawkins of Plymouth escaped destruction at the Battle of San Juan de Ulúa (1568). However, after becoming lost in the Gulf of Mexico and with a bloated crew, Hawkins abandoned more than one hundred men near Tampico. A group of the men went north (including David Ingram), while the rest went south and were captured by the Spanish. Notable among this group was Miles Philips who wrote a narrative detailing his and the other Englishmen's struggles. They were taken to Mexico City, given care at a hospital and imprisoned. After attempting to escape, they were sold as servants or slaves. Some were able to accumulate wealth by rising to the position of overseers at mines and other operations. However, after the establishment of the Mexican Inquisition, the men were stripped of any wealth and imprisoned as Lutheran heretics. Three of the men were burned, while some sixty were given penance.

In southern Baja California Sur, a few families retain the English surname "Green". This surname was established to be descended from Esteban (Steven) Green, an English whaler that settled in the region in 1834 after migrating from the United Kingdom.

The first great power that recognized the independence of Mexico was the United Kingdom in 1824, shortly after the sale of mines from Pachuca and Real del Monte occurred. The majority of migrants to this region came from what is now termed the Cornish "central mining district" of Camborne and Redruth. Real del Monte's steep streets, stairways and small squares are lined with low buildings and many houses with high sloping roofs and chimneys which indicate a Cornish influence. Mexican remittances from these miners helped to build the Wesleyan Chapel in Redruth.

The Panteón de Dolores, which became the largest cemetery in Mexico, was founded in 1875 by Juan Manuel Benfield, the son of Anglican immigrants. Benfield fulfilled his father's goal of creating a cemetery after his sister was refused burial in Catholic cemeteries and had to be interred at a beach.

According to the 1895 National Census, 3,263 residents were from the United Kingdom.

The twin silver mining settlements of Pachuca and Real del Monte are being marketed as of 2007 as 'Mexico's Little Cornwall' by the Mexican Embassy in London and represent the first attempt by the Spanish speaking part of the Cornish diaspora to establish formal links with Cornwall. The Mexican Embassy in London is also trying to establish a town twinning arrangement with Cornwall. In 2008 thirty members of the Cornish Mexican Cultural Society travelled to Mexico to try and re-trace the path of their ancestors who set off from Cornwall to start a new life in Mexico.

Culture
 
The Cornish introduced institutionalized football to Mexico. A plaque was placed at the site of the first game in Real del Monte. The English also introduced other popular sports such as rugby union, tennis, cricket, polo, and chess. Football clubs founded by Britons included the British Club, Rovers FC Mexico and Reforma Athletic Club. The most successful club founded by Britons is C.F. Pachuca.

Cuisine
The paste is a pastry with Cornish roots. Introduced by miners from Cornwall who were contracted in the towns of Real del Monte and Pachuca in Hidalgo. The Cornish miners may have also introduced the turnip to Mexico.

Demographics
There were 3,589 UK-born residents in Mexico recorded during the 2010 census, up from the 3,172 individuals counted in the 2000 census. The census only requests place of birth (administrative division or country), the government does not ask its citizens for ancestry nor additional citizenship. According to the British Embassy in Mexico, there were about 15,000 British citizens living in Mexico.

Institutions
British immigrants established several institutions of their own, among others:
 Saint Andrew's Society of Mexico (1893)
 Anglo Mexican Foundation (1943)

Notable individuals

See also

 British Honduras
 Immigration to Mexico
 Las Pozas
 Mexicans in the United Kingdom
 Mexico–United Kingdom relations

References

Further reading
 Dobson, David, Scots in Latin America, Genealogical Publishing Com. (2003)  (list of known Scottish migrants to Latin America, primarily during the 19th century)
Villalobos Velásquez, Rosario. Inmigrantes Británicos en el Distrito Minero del Real del Monte y Pachuca, 1824-1947: Un Acercamiento a la Vida Cotidiana. Mexico City: The British Council/Archivo Histórico y Museo Minería 2004.
 Young, Virginia G., The British in Mexico, The British and Commonwealth Society, (1987)

External links
 Los que llegaron - Ingleses from Canal Once (in Spanish)

 
Mexico
Ethnic groups in Mexico
European Mexican
Immigration to Mexico